The Brisbane Barracudas is an Australian club water polo team that competes in the National Water Polo League.  They have a men's team and a women's team and are based in Brisbane.

See also

Australian National Water Polo League

References

External links
 

Water polo clubs in Australia
Sporting clubs in Brisbane
Sports clubs established in 1963
1963 establishments in Australia
University and college sports clubs in Australia
Sport at the University of Queensland